Oleksiy Shpak (born 15 August 1998) is a professional Ukrainian football midfielder who plays on loan for FC Epitsentr Dunaivtsi from Mynai.

Career
Born in Chop, but growing up in Khmelnytskyi, Shpak is a product of the local youth sportive school system, and also of the BRW-VIK from Volodymyr-Volynskyi.

He played one season for Hoverla Uzhhorod in the Ukrainian Premier League Reserves, but never made his debut for the senior squad. After playing in the local amateur clubs, in September 2016 Shpak signed contract with FC Mynai and in 2020 was promoted with his teammates into the Ukrainian Premier League. He made his debut in the Ukrainian Premier League for Mynai on 20 September 2020, playing as the second half-time substituted player in a losing away match against FC Olimpik Donetsk.

References

External links 
Profile at UAF Official Site (Ukr)

1998 births
Living people
People from Chop, Ukraine
Ukrainian footballers
FC Hoverla Uzhhorod players
FC Podillya Khmelnytskyi players
FC Epitsentr Dunaivtsi players
FC Mynai players
Ukrainian Premier League players
Ukrainian First League players
Ukrainian Second League players
Association football midfielders
Sportspeople from Zakarpattia Oblast